The 2000–01 Carolina Hurricanes season was the franchise's 22nd season in the National Hockey League and fourth as the Hurricanes.

Offseason

Regular season

The Hurricanes allowed the most short-handed goals during the regular season, with 16.

Final standings

Schedule and results

October

Record for the month 3-5-3-0 (Home 2-2-2-0 Away 1-3-1-0)

November

Record for the month 7-5-0-1 (Home 3-2-0-0 Away 4-3-0-1)

December

Record for the month 4-6-1-1 (Home 3-1-0-0 Away 1-5-1-1)

January

Record for the month 8-4-2-0 (Home 6-4-1-0 Away 2-0-1-0)

February

Record for the month 5-4-2-1 (Home 3-2-0-0 Away 2-2-2-1)

March

Record for the month 8-7-0-0 (Home 5-3-0-0 Away 3-4-0-0)

April

Record for the month 3-1-1-0 (Home 1-1-0-0 Away 2-0-1-0)

Playoffs

Eastern Conference Quarterfinals
New Jersey Devils (1) vs. Carolina Hurricanes (8)

Player statistics

Awards and records

Transactions

Draft picks

Carolina's picks at the 2000 NHL Entry Draft in Calgary, Alberta, Canada. The Hurricanes have the 14th overall pick.

Farm teams

International Hockey League

The Cincinnati Cyclones are the Hurricanes International Hockey League affiliate for the 2000–01 IHL season.

East Coast Hockey League

The Florida Everblades are the Hurricanes East Coast Hockey League affiliate.

References

External links
 

Carol
Carol
Carolina Hurricanes seasons
Hurr
Hurr